Paul Dobson (born 17 December 1962) is an English former professional footballer. He was a prolific striker in the lower leagues during the 1980s and early 1990s, notably for Torquay United.

He began his career as a junior with Newcastle United, but on failing to make the grade joined Hartlepool United on a free transfer in November 1981. He scored 8 times in 31 games before leaving the Victoria Ground. However, he returned in December 1983, signing from Horden Colliery, and went on to play a further 80 league games, in which he scored 24 goals.

In July 1986 he moved to Torquay United on a free transfer and was top scorer in his first season as Torquay struggled to remain in the league. The fact that they did survive was down to Dobson's goal in injury time against Crewe Alexandra in the final game of the season, injury time only awarded after Torquay defender Jim McNichol had been bitten by a police dog. Dobson's equaliser meant that Torquay stayed in Fourth Division on goal difference, with Lincoln City the first side to suffer automatic relegation to the Nationwide Conference.

He left Plainmoor in August 1988, joining Doncaster Rovers for £20,000. After scoring 10 goals in just 24 games for Doncaster, Scarborough stepped in and paid £40,000 for his services. He scored 22 times in 61 games for Scarborough, but was out of favour at the beginning of the 1990–91 season, joining first Halifax Town on loan in October 1990, with a further loan spell at Hereford United the following month.

In January 1991 he moved to Lincoln City for £40,000, a move not taken too kindly by some Lincoln fans given that it was his goal that relegated them to the Conference. However, two goals on his debut soon put paid to any doubts they had and Dobson went on to score 3 more goals in 20 league appearances. In August 1992 he moved to Darlington, but played only 14 games (10 of which were as a substitute), scoring twice before joining Conference side Gateshead, initially on loan, in February 1993 and signing permanently for a fee of £3,500. He won the Conference Golden Boot as top-scorer in the 1993–94 and 1994–95 seasons, but after starting the first three games of the following season lost his place and featured only as a substitute until leaving to join Bishop Auckland in November 1995, Gateshead making a profit on the sale. He later ended his football career with Spennymoor United.

In May 2001, the Torquay Herald Express reported that Paul, now diagnosed as a diabetic, was living in Newton Aycliffe in County Durham and working as a welder.

References

External links
 

1962 births
Living people
Footballers from Hartlepool
Association football forwards
English footballers
Hartlepool United F.C. players
Darlington Town F.C. players
Torquay United F.C. players
Doncaster Rovers F.C. players
Scarborough F.C. players
Halifax Town A.F.C. players
Hereford United F.C. players
Lincoln City F.C. players
Darlington F.C. players
Gateshead F.C. players
Bishop Auckland F.C. players
Spennymoor United F.C. players
English Football League players